The Shiv Sena is one of the major political parties the Indian state of Maharashtra; it shares power in Maharashtra and is the coalition partner of the Bharatiya Janata Party in Maharashtra, It contested the 2019 Maharashtra Legislative Assembly election along with the Alliance partner Bharatiya Janata Party, the Shiv Sena contested on 124 seats and the Bharatiya Janata Party contested on 164 seats.

Aditya Samwad 
Through 12 such Events, 15 lakh people were directly reached on ground and over 1-crore digital impressions were generated, Aditya Samwad was successful in gaining trust from the youth all over Maharashtra and addressing their problems at ground level. Prashant Kishor led I-PAC worked on making Aditya Samwad reach more and more to the commoners, I-PAC also made sure that the programme is well on Social Media.

Jan Ashirwad Yatra 
Special Ground level Chowk Sabhas and Gram Sabhas were also carried out, with mass public support, The Jan Ashirwad Yatra was also aimed to reach out Farmers and those who previously didn't vote for the Party.

Results 

The Shiv Sena won 56 seats out of 124 seats it contested in Maharashtra, though the Sena won 7 seats less than its previous election results, the Shiv Sena became successful in establishing a base in Rural and Urban Areas of Maharashtra.

References 

2019 in Maharashtra
Politics of Maharashtra